Larramie Cortez "Doc" Shaw (born April 24, 1992) is an American actor. He is best known for his roles as Malik Payne in Tyler Perry's House of Payne, Marcus Little in The Suite Life on Deck, and King Boomer in Pair of Kings.

Life and career
Shaw was born in Atlanta, Georgia. He appeared in print ads and acted in television commercials.

In 2006, he earned the role of Malik Payne on the TBS sitcom, Tyler Perry's House of Payne. Shaw's character, Malik, is introduced as a witty preteen whose antics often get him in unintentional trouble. As he grows into a young adult, he is given more mature storylines, and by the ninth season - he is expecting his first child with his live-in girlfriend.

He was a presenter at the 39th annual NAACP Image Awards ceremony in 2008.

He joined the cast of Disney Channel sitcom The Suite Life on Deck for the show's second season which began airing on August 7, 2009, although he did not make his debut until the episode "Roomies," which aired on October 16, 2009. He played Marcus Little, a former Grammy Award winner whose career ended after his record label dumped him. On August 20, 2010, Shaw made his final appearance in The Suite Life on Deck.

Shaw next appeared on Pair of Kings with Mitchel Musso from Hannah Montana. Shaw made his singing and rapping debut on the Pair of Kings theme song, "Top of the World", also performed by Musso. The song was featured on Radio Disney on September 10, 2010. Pair of Kings airs on Disney XD.

Filmography

Television

Film

Music

References

External links

1992 births
21st-century American male actors
Male actors from Atlanta
African-American male actors
American male film actors
American male television actors
Living people
Rappers from Atlanta
American male child actors